Steven Paul Bates (born 16 January 1980 in Auckland, New Zealand) is a New Zealand rugby union footballer, whose usual position is at Number 8. He played for Waikato at provincial level and the Chiefs in the Super 14. Bates made the traditional All Blacks route to the top with appearances for New Zealand Secondary Schools, New Zealand U-19 and the U-21s, during this time he played Rugby league and was good enough to be selected for the Warriors U-19s. He has only played one test so far for his nation (v Italy 2004).

Currently, Bates resides in Fuchu, Japan with Top League team Toshiba Brave Lupus under Australian coach Joe Barakat, with other New Zealand players Richard Kahui and David Hill.

Notes and references

See also
New Zealand national rugby union team
Chiefs
Waikato

1980 births
Living people
Rugby union number eights
New Zealand rugby union players
New Zealand international rugby union players
Toshiba Brave Lupus Tokyo players
Rugby union players from Auckland
New Zealand expatriate rugby union players
Expatriate rugby union players in Japan
New Zealand expatriate sportspeople in Japan
Chiefs (rugby union) players
Auckland rugby union players
Waikato rugby union players
People educated at Kelston Boys' High School